Colyer is a community in Pennsylvania.

Colyer may also refer to:

As a given name
Colyer Meriwether (1858–1920), American historian, educator and writer

As a surname
Evelyn Colyer later Munro (1902–1930), British tennis player
Frank Colyer Sir James Frank Colyer (1866–1954), British dental surgeon and dental historian
James Colyer (c. 1560–1597), English Member of Parliament
Jeff Colyer (born 1960), American surgeon and politician; 47th Governor of Kansas
Ken Colyer (1928–1988), English trad jazz trumpeter and cornetist
Steve Colyer (born 1979), retired baseball relief pitcher with Atlanta Braves
Travis Colyer (born 1991), Australian rules footballer with Essendon
Vincent Colyer  (1825–1888), American artist noted for his images of the American West

See also 
 Collier (disambiguation)
 Collyer (disambiguation)